Ivor Marsden (11 March 1903 – 18 November 1976) was a police officer and member of the Queensland Legislative Assembly.

Biography
Marsden was born in Ipswich, Queensland, to parents Llewellyn Marsden and his wife Hannah (née Bowen). He attended primary schools in Ipswich before becoming a law clerk in the 1920s. He served in the Australian Army from 1942–1945 before becoming a police sergeant based at the Ipswich Police Station.

On 28 June 1924, he married Doris Emily Jackson (died 1980) and they had two sons and four daughters. He died in Ipswich in November 1976.

Public career
Marsden, the Labor candidate, won the by-election to replace the long serving member for Ipswich, David Gledson in 1949. He held the seat until it was abolished for the 1960 Queensland state election. He then won the new seat of Ipswich West, holding it until he retired from politics in 1966.

He was an alderman in the Ipswich City Council for six years from 1943, including the City's Vice-Mayor in 1949.

References

Members of the Queensland Legislative Assembly
1903 births
1976 deaths
Australian Labor Party members of the Parliament of Queensland
20th-century Australian politicians
Australian Army personnel of World War II